Two human polls comprised the 1953 National Collegiate Athletic Association (NCAA) football rankings. Unlike most sports, college football's governing body, the NCAA, does not bestow a national championship, instead that title is bestowed by one or more different polling agencies. There are two main weekly polls that begin in the preseason—the AP Poll and the Coaches Poll.

Legend

AP Poll
The final AP Poll was released on November 30, at the end of the 1953 regular season, weeks before the major bowls. The AP would not release a post-bowl season final poll regularly until 1968.

Final Coaches Poll
The final UP Coaches Poll was released prior to the bowl games, on November 30.
Maryland received 20 of the 35 first-place votes; Notre Dame received thirteen, and one each went to Michigan State and UCLA.

 Prior to the 1975 season, the Big Ten and Pacific Coast (later AAWU / Pac-8) conferences allowed only one postseason participant each, for the Rose Bowl.

References

College football rankings